SFK United is a Latvian football club. They compete in the Latvian Football Cup.

References

Football clubs in Latvia